This page provides links to other pages comprising the list of airports in North America.

Due to the number of airports, each country or territory has a separate list:

In Canada, the lists are available by name, by location indicator, and by province or territory:

In the United States, each state and territory has its own list:

See also
 Airports Council International-North America, the industry group collectively representing North America's airports
 Wikipedia:WikiProject Aviation/Airline destination lists: North America

 
Airports